The Kalyana Karnataka Road Transport Corporation - (KKRTC), is a state-owned public road transport corporation in the Indian state of Karnataka. It is wholly owned by the Government of Karnataka. It serves routes to towns and cities in the Northeastern part of Karnataka plus Vijayapura district and connects it to the rest of the state and the states of Tamil Nadu, Telangana, Andhra Pradesh, Maharashtra and Goa.

History

Foundation
Mysore Government Road Transport Department was inaugurated on 12 September 1948 with 120 buses. The transport department of The Mysore state administrated it until 1961.

Corporatization
It was subsequently converted into an independent corporation under Section 3 of the Road Transport Corporation Act, 1950 on 1 August 1961, In 1961, after successfully converting into an independent corporation all assets and liabilities of MGRTD were transferred to Mysore State Road Transport Corporation.

Merger 
On 1 October 1961, Bangalore Transport Service was merged with it.

Renaming
On 1 November 1973, the Mysore state was renamed as Karnataka thus, renaming it Karnataka State Road Transport Corporation.

Bifurcation
 On 15 August 1997, Bengaluru Metropolitan Transport Corporation (then Bangalore Metropolitan Transport Corporation) was bifurcated to cater to the transportation needs of Bengaluru Metropolitan Region. It was formed by separating the Bangalore Transport Service.
 on 1 November 1997, North Western Karnataka Road Transport Corporation was bifurcated to cater to the transportation needs of Northwestern parts of Karnataka.
 On 15 August 2000, Kalyana Karnataka Road Transport Corporation (then North Eastern Karnataka Road Transport Corporation) was bifurcated to cater to the transportation needs of Northeastern parts of Karnataka.
This left the Karnataka State Road Transport Corporation to serve the Southern part of Karnataka.

 On 23 November 2009, Vijayapura division was transferred from NWKRTC to KKRTC.

Services
Kalyana Karnataka Sarige: It is a non-AC bus service with 3+2 non-reclining seats built on single-axle Ashok Leyland, Tata and Eicher suburban chassis with a tirangi livery of three colours consisting of white, yellow and crimson colours. It is an interdistrict, interstate service in Kalyana Karnataka (Northeastern Karnataka) and Vijayapura district.
Kalyana Gramantara Sarige: It is a non-AC bus service with 3+2 non-reclining seats built on single-axle Ashok Leyland, Tata and Eicher suburban chassis with a durangi livery of dual colours consisting of blue and white colours. It is a service to connect villages to nearby cities and towns in Kalyana Karnataka (Northeastern Karnataka) and Vijayapura district.
Kalyana Nagara Sarige: It is a non-AC bus service with 2+2 non-reclining seats built on single-axle Ashok Leyland, Tata and Eicher urban chassis with various liveries and branding depending upon the locale. It is an intracity and town service in Kalyana Karnataka (Northeastern Karnataka) and Vijayapura district.
Rajahamsa Class: It is a non-AC ultra-deluxe bus service with 2+2 reclining seats built on single-axle Ashok Leyland, Tata and Eicher chassis with a white livery. It is a long-distance service operating out of Kalyana Karnataka (Northeastern Karnataka) and Vijayapura district.
Non-AC Sleeper Class: It is a non-AC ultra-deluxe bus service with 2+1 lower and upper berth sleeper seats built on single-axle Ashok Leyland, Tata and Eicher chassis with a white livery. It is a long-distance service operating out of Kalyana Karnataka (Northeastern Karnataka) and Vijayapura district.
Ambaari Class: It is an AC luxury bus service with 2+1 lower and upper berth sleeper seats built on a single-axle Corona chassis with a white livery. It is a long-distance service operating out of Kalyana Karnataka (Northeastern Karnataka) and Vijayapura district.

Former Services
Meghdooth Class: It is an AC luxury bus service with 2+2 reclining seats built on a single-axle Ashok Leyland chassis with a dark blue-white livery. It is a long-distance service operating out of Kalyana Karnataka (Northeastern Karnataka) and Vijayapura district. This service was replaced with Sheethal Class.
Sheethal Class: It is an AC luxury bus service with 2+2 reclining seats built on a single-axle Ashok Leyland chassis with a green livery. It is a long-distance service operating out of Kalyana Karnataka (Northeastern Karnataka) and Vijayapura district. Currently defunct.
Vaibhav Class: It is a non-AC semi-deluxe bus service with 2+2 reclining seats with less reclining compared to Rajahamsa Executive Class built on a single-axle Ashok Leyland chassis with a green livery. It is a long-distance service operating out of Kalyana Karnataka (Northeastern Karnataka) and Vijayapura district. Currently defunct.
Suhasa Class: It is a non-AC ultra-deluxe bus service with 2+2 reclining seats built on Ashok Leyland, Tata and Eicher chassis with a yellow livery. It is a long-distance service operating out of Kalyana Karnataka (Northeastern Karnataka) and Vijayapura district. Rebranded and merged with Rajahamsa Executive Class.

All Karnataka's Road Transport Corporations
Karnataka State Road Transport Corporation: Operates out of Southern Karnataka.
North Western Karnataka Road Transport Corporation: Operates out of Northwestern Karnataka except Vijayapura district.
Kalyana Karnataka Road Transport Corporation: Operates out of Northeastern Karnataka and Vijayapura district.
Bengaluru Metropolitan Transport Corporation: Operates in Bengaluru Metropolitan Region offering transit service.

Namma Cargo Logistics and Parcel Services 
Namma Cargo Logistics and Parcel Services was launched on 26 February 2021. It provides cargo and parcel services on the routes in which the KSRTC, NWKRTC and KKRTC buses travel.

See also

List of bus depots in Karnataka
List of bus stations in Karnataka
North Western Karnataka Road Transport Corporation
Karnataka State Road Transport Corporation
Bengaluru Metropolitan Transport Corporation

References

State road transport corporations of India
Transport in Karnataka
2000 establishments in Karnataka
Government agencies established in 2000
State agencies of Karnataka
Bus transport in Karnataka
Companies based in Kalaburagi